Genrikh Poghosyan was the First Secretary of the Nagorno-Karabakh Autonomous Oblast Committee of the Communist Party of the Azerbaijan Soviet Socialist Republic. He was appointed in February 1988, succeeding Boris Kevorkov.  The government of the Azerbaijan SSR abolished the autonomous oblast in 1991.

Biography
Poghosyan was the Deputy Secretary of the CPSU committee for the Nagorno-Karabakh Autonomous Oblast up until 1988. Secretary Boris Kevorkov was very loyal to Azerbaijani leaders in Baku, and was resented by the Armenian community.

During the Karabakh movement, 87 Armenian deputies from the Regional Soviet called an emergency session of the assembly on 20 February 1988 in response to Armenian demonstrations in Stepanakert calling for the unification of Karabakh and Armenia. Kevorkov had tried and failed to stop the session's taking place, and when 110 Armenian deputies voted unanimously for the resolution, calling for Nagorny Karabakh to join Soviet Armenia, tried to swipe the stamp needed to confirm the resolution. Kevorkov was removed from office by Moscow emissaries and succeeded by Poghosyan on 24 February 1988.

Poghosyan was much more popular among Karabakh Armenians. A few months later he began to support the campaign for unification with Armenia. Poghosyan held his position as secretary until the autonomous oblast was abolished on 26 November 1991, at which time the Nagorno-Karabakh Republic had been declared two months prior and the First Nagorno-Karabakh War had turned full-scale.

References

Bibliography

Soviet politicians
Armenian politicians
Soviet Armenians
Politicians from the Republic of Artsakh
First Nagorno-Karabakh War
People from the Republic of Artsakh
1931 births
2000 deaths